First Channel, also called 1TV,  is a Georgian television channel owned and operated by Georgian Public Broadcasting, launched in 1956. This channel is received by the 85% of the population of Georgia.

Programs 
The content of the channel is based on news, talk programs, sports, children's programming, the Eurovision Song Contest and foreign movies.

 Moambe (მოამბე)
 P'olit'ik'uri k'vira (პოლიტიკური კვირა)
 P'irveli tema (პირველი თემა)
 Me miq'vars sakartvelo (მე მიყვარს საქართველო)
 Tskhovreba mshvenieria (ცხოვრება მშვენიერია)

References

External links
 
 1TV Live
Mobile TV app (IOS and Android):
IOS App
Android App

Television stations in Georgia (country)
Television channels and stations established in 1956
Georgian-language television stations
Commercial-free television networks